Palm Beach Synagogue is a Modern Orthodox synagogue founded in 1994 in Palm Beach, Florida by Rabbi Moshe and Dinie Scheiner. The building was among the 28 winners of the 2016 Faith & Form/IFRAA Religious Art and Architecture Award, which earned recognition for liturgical interior design by New York-based architect Arthur Chabon.

References 

1994 establishments in Florida
Jewish organizations established in 1994
Orthodox Judaism in Florida
Modern Orthodox synagogues in the United States
Synagogues in Florida